Diante do Trono is the first album in the live praise and worship series of contemporary worship music by Diante do Trono.

About the Project 

In 1995, the pastor Márcio Valadão, father of Ana Paula and Sérgio Gomes, conductor of the Church, decided to make a record, whose income would serve to combat child prostitution that they saw on a trip to India.

In 1997 the city of Belo Horizonte, in the Lagoinha Baptist Church, under the leadership of Ana Paula Valadão is formed a group of praise and worship, which until then had no name.

In 1998 a group of musicians from the Lagoinha Baptist Church, in Belo Horizonte, met to record the songs sung in the community. With five versions of American composers and six authorship of the group, under the leadership of Ana Paula Valadão, CD Diante do Trono church took shape in the temple itself. For two hours, 7,000 people sang and danced, creating a new trend and legitimizing a new concept of music in the Christian community.

The material for the album was recorded on January 31, 1998, a cult of the Lagoinha Baptist Church. Along with Ana Paula, the vocals were formed by singers like André Valadão, his brother, and Nívea Soares.

A few months after recording the musical work was released, especially the song "Diante do Trono". With the positive impact of the song, the group, which until then had no official name, became known Diante do Trono. Besides this, other songs of the set were also very popular on the radio, especially "Aclame ao Senhor", "Deus de Amor" and "Manancial".

The repertoire of the album contains versioned songs (such as "Te Agradeço" [written by Dennis Jernigan ] and "Aclame ao Senhor" [written by Darlene Zschech ] and unreleased songs (such as "A Quem Temerei?" And "Diante do Trono", which gives name to the album). versions and unreleased songs are all authored by Ana Paula Valadão.

Track listing (CD)

Track listing (DVD)

References

1998 live albums
1998 video albums
Live video albums
Portuguese-language live albums
Diante do Trono video albums
Diante do Trono live albums